University Park is a village, a south suburb of Chicago mostly in Will County with a small portion in Cook County in the U.S. state of Illinois. The village is one of the region's few planned communities, was developed in the 1960s as Wood Hill, then Park Forest South, and finally University Park. Governors State University was established in the village in 1969. The village population was 7,145 at the 2020 census.

History 

In the late 1950s, Woodhill Enterprises purchased land south of Park Forest for a large subdivision. Building began in 1961, but by 1967 Wood Hill had only 240 homes. Residents created a homeowners association, which fostered a community identity.

In 1966, Nathan Manilow, one of the developers of Park Forest, started to purchase land around Wood Hill. Park Forest had been a model for planning in the 1940s, and Lewis Manilow, son of Nathan, formed New Community Enterprises (NCE) to build "a whole new town". Major partners included Illinois Central Industries and United States Gypsum Company.

NCE supported the incorporation of Park Forest South in 1967 with projections for 100,000 residents. Under the federal New Communities Act of 1968, Park Forest South was designated as one of 15 such "new communities". Planning included space for residential, commercial, and industrial development and addressed the needs of education, recreation, and faith communities. Racial integration was a goal from the beginning, and Park Forest South became a leader in support of open housing.

Governors State University opened its doors in 1969.  The Illinois Central Railroad made its first commuter extension in 40 years there.  As a result, it is the last stop on the Metra Electric District line. The city's initial plan included wooded preserves and recreation areas, building on recreation area set-asides and major land donations by the Manilow organization.

The creativity and energy of the developers and village leadership led to great hopes for their "whole new town". In 1970, the state of Illinois allocated $24 million for the GSU campus. In 1971, HUD guaranteed $30 million in loans to bring the vision to reality.

The developers modernized the water and sewage treatment facilities and in 1970 initiated the first elementary school, the first apartment complex, and Governors Gateway Industrial Park.

However, difficulties arose in the economy, in the requirements and lack of resources from HUD, in the projections for growth, and in other areas, leading to suspended development in late 1974. For over two years, intense activity at public and private levels untangled many of the problems. The new town, intended for 100,000, adapted to a slow-growth plan anticipating an eventual 20,000 to 25,000 residents. The 2000 population, however, was 6,662, up slightly from the previous decade.

New town planning remains evident. The industrial park next to Interstate 57 is integral to the village, and residential areas continue to offer open space, bikeways, and additional development. The new town heritage includes the Nathan Manilow Sculpture Park, a monumental internationally recognized outdoor sculpture park at GSU developed by Lewis Manilow to honor his father.

Notable people
Shonda Rhimes, television producer, screenwriter, and creator, head writer and executive producer of hit television series Grey's Anatomy, Private Practice, Scandal and How to Get Away With Murder, resided in University Park (formerly Park Forest South) as a child.

Geography
University Park is located at  (41.439460, -87.697299).

The village lies on the Valparaiso Moraine, which is also the Eastern Continental Divide.

Surrounding areas
 Richton Park
 Richton Park    Park Forest 
 Frankfort / Unincorporated Will County   Steger / Crete
 Unincorporated Will County    Unincorporated Will County
 Monee / Unincorporated Will County

Demographics
As of the 2020 census there were 7,145 people, 2,508 households, and 1,831 families residing in the village. The racial makeup of the village was 87.64% African American, 5.16% White, 0.29% Native American, 0.28% Asian, 2.23% from other races, and 4.39% from two or more races. Hispanic or Latino of any race were 4.04% of the population.

There were 2,508 households, out of which 71.85% had children under the age of 18 living with them, 33.69% were married couples living together, 32.18% had a female householder with no husband present, and 26.99% were non-families. 22.77% of all households were made up of individuals, and 9.49% had someone living alone who was 65 years of age or older. The average household size was 3.37 and the average family size was 2.87.

The village's age distribution consisted of 32.0% under the age of 18, 6.2% from 18 to 24, 30.8% from 25 to 44, 20.7% from 45 to 64, and 10.3% who were 65 years of age or older. The median age was 30.6 years. For every 100 females, there were 66.5 males. For every 100 females age 18 and over, there were 56.5 males.

The median income for a household in the village was $62,258, and the median income for a family was $63,551. Males had a median income of $43,093 versus $31,448 for females. The per capita income for the village was $23,354. About 9.4% of families and 10.3% of the population were below the poverty line, including 13.2% of those under age 18 and 3.2% of those age 65 or over.

Note: the US Census treats Hispanic/Latino as an ethnic category. This table excludes Latinos from the racial categories and assigns them to a separate category. Hispanics/Latinos can be of any race.

Government
University Park is in the Second Congressional District.

References

Further reading
 McClellan, Larry A. Park Forest South, History and Development: An Annotated Bibliography. Chicago, Ill: CPL Bibliographies, 1980. 
 McClellan, Larry. Park Forest South/University Park: A Guide to Its History and Development. 1986.

External links
Village website
Governors State University

Villages in Cook County, Illinois
Villages in Will County, Illinois
Populated places established in 1967
1967 establishments in Illinois
Majority-minority cities and towns in Will County, Illinois